The Insurgentes Ice Rink is an indoor arena located in Mexico City that hosted the wrestling competitions for the 1968 Summer Olympics.

References
1968 Summer Olympics official report. Volume 2. Part 1. p. 78.

Venues of the 1968 Summer Olympics
Olympic wrestling venues
Indoor arenas in Mexico
Sports venues in Mexico City
Boxing venues in Mexico